Staré Bříště is a municipality and village in Pelhřimov District in the Vysočina Region of the Czech Republic. It has about 70 inhabitants.

Administrative parts
The village of Vlčí Hory is an administrative part of Staré Bříště.

References

Villages in Pelhřimov District